Rahiyan Kermanshah Football Club (former named by Shirin Faraz) is an Iranian football club based in Kermanshah, Iran and compete in the Azadegan League. The club is in the private ownership of Farman Karimi.

History

Establishment
Before the start of the 2006–07 season, Oghab, a team with much history, sold its right to participate in the Azadegan League to Shirin Faraz. In 2012 the club name and sponsorship changed to Rahian Kermanshah.

Promotion to Iran Pro League
The club achieved promotion to the Iran Pro League in 2007 after a 4–2 aggregate playoff victory against Tractor, along with Pegah Gilan.

Relegation
Shirin Faraz was relegated from the Persian Gulf Cup with 3 games remaining in the season. The team was plagued with coaching and management problems for most of the season and often fielded teams consisting mostly of players from their youth squad. They failed to gain promotion the season after and finished mid table in their group. In 2012 Farman Karimi took over the club and renamed it Rahian Kermanshah Football Club.

Name history
Shirin Faraz Kermanshah (2006–2012)
Rahiyan Kermanshah (Since 2012)

Stadium
The 15 Khordad Stadium in Kermanshah has a capacity of 15,000.

Season-by-season
The table below chronicles the achievements of Shirin Faraz in various competitions since 2006.

Club managers

Managerial history

Players
As of October 30, 2010.

First-team squad

For recent transfers, see List of Iranian football transfers, summer 2010''.

References

Official
 Official website
  Players and Results

Football clubs in Iran
Sport in Kermanshah Province
2006 establishments in Iran
Association football clubs established in 2006
Kermanshah